David Jones (1 November 1810 – 1 July 1869) was a Welsh banker and Conservative Party politician.

Early life
Born in Llwynberllan near Llandovery, Carmarthenshire, he was the eldest son of John and Mary Jones and was educated at Charterhouse School. He married Margaret Charlotte Campbell, daughter of Sir George Campbell, 4th Baronet in 1845. They made their home at Glanebrane Park, Llandovery and had 2 daughters and 2 sons. He held the office of High Sheriff of Carmarthenshire in 1845 and was a deputy lieutenant for Breconshire, Carmarthenshire and Radnorshire.

Banking
His grandfather, also David Jones, had established a bank in Llandovery in 1799, and on his death in 1839 the business passed to David and his two younger brothers, William and John. The brothers expanded the bank as David Jones & Company. In about 1850 Jones purchased the 7,854 acre estate of Pantglas, Llanfynydd and built a large house there at the considerable cost of £30,000. The Italianate mansion had a central tower and classical colonnades and a top-lit hall with large mahogany staircase.

Member of parliament
In April 1852 the Hon. George Rice-Trevor, one of two members of parliament for the County of Carmarthenshire, succeeded his father as Baron Dynevor. This led to a vacancy, and Jones was chosen to defend the seat for the Conservatives. As the only candidate he was elected unopposed to the House of Commons on 13 May. He held the seat for 16 years, being returned at each general election without opposition.

At a time when the parliamentary representation Carmarthenshire was largely dependent on informal agreements between prominent local landowners to avoid contested elections much emphasis was placed upon appealing to a broad range of what was regarded as 'moderate' opinion. Jones's address to the electors when seeking re-election in 1857 reflects this as he declared that "I shall, if re-elected, be prepared to give my independent, but not indiscriminate, support to any Government which shall bring forward measures that may appear to me likely to promote the common welfare." Nominating Jones at Carmarthen shortly after, W.R.H. Powell of Maesgwynne declared that "they no longer saw the red and blue flags unfurled, which to his mind was an evidence that party feeling was dying out in the country".

Death
By 1868 Jones was in ill-health, and decided not to contest the general election. His seat was held by his younger brother, John. He died at Pantglas in July 1869, and was buried in the family vault at Cilycwm Church.

References

External links

1810 births
1869 deaths
Conservative Party (UK) MPs for Welsh constituencies
UK MPs 1847–1852
UK MPs 1852–1857
UK MPs 1857–1859
UK MPs 1859–1865
UK MPs 1865–1868
People from Llandovery
People educated at Charterhouse School
Deputy Lieutenants of Brecknockshire
Deputy Lieutenants of Radnorshire
Deputy Lieutenants of Carmarthenshire
High Sheriffs of Carmarthenshire
Welsh bankers
19th-century British businesspeople